Founder's Hall, also known as Haskell Hall, is a historic academic building on the campus of Atlantic Union College in Lancaster, Massachusetts, United States. Built in 1883, it is the oldest educational building constructed for a Seventh-day Adventist school. The building was listed on the National Register of Historic Places in 1980.

Description and history
Founder's Hall is set near the center of the Atlantic Union College campus, located on the west side of Main Street (Massachusetts Route 70) in South Lancaster. It is a 2-1/2 story wood frame building, with a hip roof and a projecting gable section topped by a square tower. The tower has an open upper level, with arched openings supported by square posts. A shed-roof porch extends across the projecting section, with ornate Victorian trim.  Its only major external modifications have been the addition of small exit doors which provide access to an iron fire escape staircase.

Originally known as South Lancaster Academy, the school was established in 1883 by Stephen N. Haskell, an elder of the Seventh-day Adventist (SDA) church. The building was designed by Worcester architects Barker & Nourse, and is the oldest educational SDA facility standing.  It was built using mainly donated labor, from wood cut nearby. The building has seen a succession of educational uses, housing the music department and religion center, as well as a collection of SDA memorabilia. The institution changed names, first to Lancaster Junior College, and then to Atlantic Union College, whose administrative offices it now houses.

See also
National Register of Historic Places listings in Worcester County, Massachusetts

References

University and college buildings on the National Register of Historic Places in Massachusetts
School buildings completed in 1883
Buildings and structures in Lancaster, Massachusetts
National Register of Historic Places in Worcester County, Massachusetts